Fasolis is a surname. Notable people with this surname include:

 Clotilde Fasolis (born 1951), Italian former alpine skier
 Diego Fasolis (born 1958), Swiss classical organist and conductor

See also
 Fasoli